Addicted, which is officially trademarked as addicted, is an American reality television series that follows the lives of individuals who are struggling with addiction as they work with interventionist Kristina Wandzilak. The series premiered on TLC on March 17, 2010. Addicted returned with a second season on August 28, 2012 on Discovery Fit & Health (now Discovery Life), and has also aired on TLC.

Episodes

Season 1

Season 2

References

External links 

Addicted on TLC (Season One)
Addicted on Discovery Life (Season Two)

2010s American reality television series
2010 American television series debuts
2012 American television series endings
TLC (TV network) original programming